The Ministry of Justice and Constitutional Affairs of Eswatini oversees the administration of justice through the various courts. The ministry has responsibilities such as the following:

 Coordinating, advising on, providing support and implementation of policies that will support the administration of law and justice as well as constitutional governance
 Aiding in the development and enactment of appropriate legislation
 Drafting, revising, and reforming the laws of Swaziland and any related legal documents
 Advising the federal government and its allies on legal matters
 Overseeing the training of lawyers
 Promoting and protecting human rights, as well as prevent societal corruption
 Providing safe custody of inmates and offering rehabilitation services

List of ministers (Post-1968 upon achieving independence) 

 Polycarp Dlamini (1972-1983)
 David Matse (1984-1987)
 Reginald Dhladhla (1988-1990)
 Amos Zonke Khumalo (1991-1993)
 Maweni Simelane (1994-2003)
 Magwagwa Mduli (2003)
 David Dlamini (2004-2009)
 Ndumiso Mamba (2009-2011)
 Mgwagwa Gamedze (2011-2013)
 Sibusiso Shongwe (2013-2015)
 Edgar Hillary (2015–2018)
 Pholile Dlamini-Shakantu (2018-present)

See also 
 Justice ministry
 Politics of Eswatini

References 

Justice ministries
Government of Eswatini